United States gubernatorial elections were held in 1912, in 33 states, concurrent with the House, Senate elections and presidential election, on November 5, 1912 (except in Arkansas, Georgia, Maine and Vermont). In addition, there was a special election in Georgia on January 10, 1912.

In Rhode Island, the governor was elected to a two-year term for the first time, instead of a one-year term. In Vermont, the gubernatorial election was held in September for the last time, moving to the same day as federal elections from the 1914 elections.

Results

Special election (January 1912)

Regular elections (Autumn 1912)

See also 
1912 United States elections
1912 United States presidential election
1912–13 United States Senate elections
1912 United States House of Representatives elections

References

Bibliography

Notes 

 
November 1912 events in the United States